
The Gulf of Boni, also known as the Gulf of Bone, Bay of Boni, and Bone Bay, is the gulf which divides the South and Southeast Peninsulas of the island of Sulawesi (Celebes) in Indonesia. It opens on the south into the Banda Sea.

Extent
The International Hydrographic Organization (IHO) defines the Gulf of Boni as being one of the divisions of the East Indian Archipelago. It is defined as the waters north of the "line from Tg. Lassa, Celebes, to the North point of Kabaena and thence up this meridian to the coast of Celebes".

See also
Gulf of Tomini 
Gulf of Tolo

References

Citations

Bibliography
 .

Bays of Indonesia
Landforms of Sulawesi
Landforms of South Sulawesi
Landforms of Southeast Sulawesi
Banda Sea